And I Love You So was Perry Como's 21st 12" long-play album released by RCA Records.

As with It's Impossible, this album was issued to feature a surprise hit single, Don McLean's "And I Love You So".  Como brought the song to the national top 40 (Number One Easy Listening). Previous versions of the song by Bobby Goldsboro and Bobby Vinton had met with mild or no success. Como's version was so successful, RCA asked him to record the song in Spanish.  When Como said he didn't speak the language, he received personal Spanish lessons from the head of RCA International to get the record made. As in recent Como LP's, this collection features selections from then contemporary recording artists such as Roberta Flack, The Carpenters, Ray Price, Tony Orlando and Dawn, Bread and Mac Davis.  The album was among the last to be produced by Chet Atkins before he stepped down from his executive position at RCA's Nashville studios.

Track listing

Side One
"And I Love You So" (Words and Music by Don McLean) - 3:18
"Killing Me Softly With Her Song" (Music by Charles Fox and lyrics by Norman Gimbel) - 4:29
"For the Good Times" (Words and Music by Kris Kristofferson) - 3:38
"Aubrey" (Words and Music by David A. Gates) - 3:34
"Sing" (Words and Music by Joe Raposo) - 2:40

Side Two
"I Want to Give" (Lyrics By Gene Nash) - 3:04
"Tie a Yellow Ribbon Round the Ole Oak Tree" (Music by L. Russell Brown and lyrics by Irwin Levine) - 3:02
"I Thought About You" (Words and Music by Ronald E. McCown) - 2:16
"It All Seems to Fall Into Line" (Music by Ben Weisman and lyrics by Al Stillman) - 2:51
"I Believe in Music" (Words and Music by Mac Davis) - 2:56

Charts

Weekly charts

Year-end charts

Certifications

References

External links
Perry Como Discography

Perry Como albums
1973 albums
Albums produced by Chet Atkins
RCA Records albums